Paul de Barry (born at Leucate in 1587; died at Avignon, 28 July 1661) was a French Jesuit and writer. He was rector of the Jesuit colleges at Aix, Nîmes, and Avignon, and Provincial of Lyon.

Works
He composed a number of devotional works on the Blessed Virgin, St. Joseph, and the saints, and a Pensez-y-bien, which latter had a large circulation and has been translated into several languages. Translated into English are "Pious Remarks upon the Life of St. Joseph", published in 1600; the "Glories of St. Joseph" (Dublin, 1835); "Devotions to St. Joseph", edited by the Rev. G. Tickell, S.J. (London, 187–).

References
Bibliothèque de la compagnie de Jésus, I, 945.

1587 births
1661 deaths
16th-century French Jesuits